Orthenches homerica is a moth of the family Plutellidae first described by John Salmon in 1956. It is endemic to New Zealand.

References

Plutellidae
Moths of New Zealand
Moths described in 1956
Endemic fauna of New Zealand
Taxa named by John Salmon
Endemic moths of New Zealand